The 2nd constituency of Marne (French: Deuxième circonscription de la Marne) is one of five electoral districts in the department of the same name, each of which returns one deputy to the French National Assembly in elections using the two-round system, with a run-off if no candidate receives more than 50% of the vote in the first round.

Description
The constituency is made up of six whole former cantons – those of Fismes, Reims I, Reims III, Reims V, Reims VIII, and Ville-en-Tardenois – plus the major part of the former canton of Châtillon-sur-Marne (all communes except those of Courtagnon, Nanteuil-la-Forêt, and Pourcy).

It includes the centre and south of Reims as well as rural areas to the south of the city. The seat as currently delineated is substantially different from that which existed prior to the 2012 election, which contained little of Reims and was far more rural in character.

At the time of the 1999 census (which was the basis for the most recent redrawing of constituency boundaries, carried out in 2010) the 2nd constituency had a total population of 103,767.

For 24 years from 1993 the seat was held by the Gaullist right, from 2002 in the person of Catherine Vautrin who held various posts in the governments of Jean-Pierre Raffarin and Dominique de Villepin. However, in the 2017 election Vautrin lost her seat to Aina Kuric of La République En Marche! (REM). Kuric resigned her membership of LREM on 7 June 2019, joining Agir.

Historic representation

Election results

2023 by-election 
On 2 December 2022, Anne-Sophie Frigout's election was annulled by the Constitutional Council. She lost the seat in the second round of the by-election on 29 January 2023.

 
 
|-
| colspan="8" bgcolor="#E9E9E9"|
|-

2022 

 
 
|-
| colspan="8" bgcolor="#E9E9E9"|
|-
 
 

 
 
 
 

* Kuric stood as a dissident LREM candidate, without the support of the party or the Ensemble Citoyens alliance. Kuric's results in the last election are counted against the official LREM candidate for swing calculations.

2017

2012

 
 
 
 
 
|-
| colspan="8" bgcolor="#E9E9E9"|
|-

Sources
Official results of French elections from 2002: "Résultats électoraux officiels en France" (in French).
Official results of the French elections from 2017: "" (in French).

2